Harville Hendrix (born 1935) is an American writer.

Hendrix is best known for the book Getting the Love You Want, which gained in popularity during Hendrix's 17 appearances on The Oprah Winfrey Show. 

He is a member of the American Association of Pastoral Counselors as well as a clinical member of the American Group Psychotherapy Association and the International Transactional Analysis Association, and has produced 10 written works in partnership with his wife and American activist, Helen LaKelly Hunt.

Career 
Hendrix was born in 1935 in Statesboro, Georgia. At the age of 17 he became an ordained Baptist minister, after which he continued on to receive his B.A. at Mercer University in Georgia, in 1957, and his B.D. from Union Theological Seminary in 1961. Following this, Hendrix then went on to receive both an M.A. and Ph.D. in psychology and religion from the Divinity School at the University of Chicago.

Hendrix, along with his wife Helen LaKelly Hunt, developed Imago Relationship Therapy, a form of relationship and couples therapy.

Bibliography
 Hendrix, Harville; LaKelly Hunt, Helen (1988). Getting the Love You Want: A Guide for Couples. St. Martin's Griffin. .
 Hendrix, Harville; LaKelly Hunt, Helen (1993). Keeping the Love You Find. Atria. .
 

Hendrix, Harville; LaKelly Hunt, Helen (1997). Giving the Love That Heals. Atria. .

 Hendrix, Harville; LaKelly Hunt, Helen (2004). Receiving Love. Atria. .
 Hendrix, Harville; LaKelly Hunt, Helen (2013). Making Marriage Simple: Ten Relationship-Saving Truths. Harmony Books. .
 Hendrix, Harville; LaKelly Hunt, Helen (2017). The Space Between : The Point of Connection. Franklin, TN: Clovercroft Publishing. .

References

External links
 

1935 births
Living people
Union Theological Seminary (New York City) alumni
University of Chicago Divinity School alumni
American self-help writers
Relationship education
Mercer University alumni
Hunt family
American relationships and sexuality writers
People from Statesboro, Georgia
Writers from Georgia (U.S. state)